This table displays the top-rated primetime television series of the 1954–55 season as measured by Nielsen Media Research.

References

1954 in American television
1955 in American television
1954-related lists
1955-related lists
Lists of American television series